Richard Peter Snell (born 12 September 1968) is a former South African cricketer who played in five Test matches and 42 One Day Internationals for South Africa.  

He played for Transvaal in the early 1990s forming a formidable opening pair with Steven Jack.

International career
He took South Africa's first Test wicket after they were re-admitted to international cricket.  His 5/40 against Australia at MCG in the Benson & Hedges World Series in 1993–1994 being the best.  His four wickets for 12 runs against Sri Lanka during the Hero Cup in 1993 was highly impressive. His highest score in ODIs was 63 which came as an opener against England at Chevrolet Park, Bloemfontein in 1996.

After cricket
Since retiring from first class cricket in 1998, Richard Snell, worked as a trained physiotherapist before joining his family's industrial cleaning service and supply business, Reno Industrial Africa.

References

1968 births
Living people
Cricketers at the 1992 Cricket World Cup
Gauteng cricketers
Somerset cricketers
South Africa One Day International cricketers
South Africa Test cricketers
South African cricketers
Cricketers from Durban